My Life is a 1993 American drama film starring Michael Keaton and Nicole Kidman and directed by Bruce Joel Rubin. With a PG-13 rating, this film's worldwide box office gross was $54 million.

Plot 

Bob Ivanovich, a young son of Ukrainian-American parents, prays one night for a circus to be erected in his backyard the following day. After school the next day, he runs home eagerly, followed by his friends. To his disappointment, no circus awaits. Angrily, Bob retreats to the closet in his room, his personal retreat space.

Bob has shunned his Ukrainian-born parents for their customs and traditions, leading him to move away from his family in Detroit. Thirty years later, Bob Jones now runs a Los Angeles public relations firm. He is happily married to Gail, who is pregnant with their first child. Bob is horrified to learn that he has been diagnosed with a terminal form of kidney cancer and might not live to see their baby born.

Bob begins to make home movies, to immortalize himself, to be shown after his death to his son, so he'll know who his father was, showing him how to cook spaghetti, how to drive, etc. He also begins to visit a Chinese healer named Mr. Ho, who urges him to listen to his heart, which is calling him to forgive, and that life is always giving him invitations if he would just listen. At his wife's urging, they fly to his hometown of Detroit to attend a traditional Ukrainian wedding of his brother Paul. While in the area, Bob visits his childhood home. Also while there, they attempt to mend fences with his estranged family, which does not go well. Bob criticizes his brother for not moving to California like he did, and his father resents Bob's moving thousands of miles away and changing his name.

Bob returns to California with a heavy heart, sadly saying to his wife, "This is my last trip home." At his next visit, Mr. Ho advises Bob to go into his heart "soon." Bob teaches his son by camera how to shave, play basketball, and start a car by jumper cable. He also confronts a childhood fear by finally riding a formidable roller coaster(That was filmed in Twisted Colossus). During the ride, a young companion urges him to let go of the railing as the descent begins, but Bob firmly holds on. (A metaphor of his fear of letting go of life.) He is living on borrowed time—beyond the date the doctors gave him, as he says to his wife after getting off the coaster, "Today is D-Day. Death Day. I was supposed to be dead by today."

Gail's contractions increase, and soon she is in the hospital, to give birth to their baby. Bob and Gail have a happy time with their newborn named Brian, but soon Bob's condition worsens, now that the cancer has reached his brain. Hospice care is arranged for Bob. Bob makes a final visit to Mr. Ho, and asks him what the light is he keeps seeing. Mr. Ho replies it is "the life of the self" and urges him to get his "house in order (life and personal affairs)."

A hospice nurse, Theresa moves in to help, but Bob's health continues to fail. Bob and Gail finally call his family to inform them of what's going on. Bob's family comes west for the first time to visit. Bob makes peace with his family at last. Bob's childhood wish is finally granted by a circus in the backyard.

As his father shaves him, Bob shows that he has at last made peace by telling his father he loves him. Bob finally comes to terms with his life as he dies peacefully, surrounded by the loving, supportive bosom of his family. Next is shown Bob on a metaphysical roller coaster, this time letting go of the railing, raising his arms freely in the air this time, metaphorically letting go of life, and finally enjoying the ride of life. Bob rides toward a beautiful, shining, ethereal light (presumably heaven). A year later, Brian and Gail watch him on video, as he reads Dr. Seuss's Green Eggs and Ham to him.

Cast
 Michael Keaton as Robert "Bob" Ivanovich/Jones
 Nicole Kidman as Gail Jones
 Bradley Whitford as Paul Ivanovich
 Rebecca Schull as Rose Ivanovich
 Michael Constantine as Bill Ivanovich
 Queen Latifah as Theresa
 Mark Holton as Sam
 Haing S. Ngor as Mr. Ho
 Lissa Walters as Deborah
 Lee Garlington as Carol Sandman
 Romy Rosemont as Anya Stasiuk
 Richard Schiff as Young Bil Ivanovich
 Brenda Strong as Laura
 Bruce Jarchow as Walter
 Kenneth Tigar as Dr. Califano
 Sylvia Kauders as Aunt Tekla
 Magda Harout as Aunt Sonia
 Mark Lowenthal as Dr. Mills
 Toni Sawyer as Doris
 Danny Rimmer as Young Bobbie
 Ruth de Sosa as Young Rose Ivanovich
 Rudi Davis as George
 Jane Morris as Dorothy
 Charlotte Zucker as Guest at Wedding

Reception

Box office 
My Life opened at number 3 at the US box office behind The Three Musketeers and Carlito's Way. It was number one in Italy for two weeks. It grossed $27 million in the United States and Canada and the same internationally for a worldwide gross of $54 million.

Critical response
The film received mixed reviews from critics. On Rotten Tomatoes it has an approval rating of 44% based on reviews from 25 critics. Audiences surveyed by CinemaScore gave the film a grade A on scale of A to F.

Roger Ebert of the Chicago Sun-Times gave the film 2.5/4 and wrote: "My Life should be a more rigorous and single-minded film; maybe it started that way, before getting spoonfuls of honey to make the medicine go down."

References

External links
 
 
 
 

1993 films
1993 drama films
American drama films
Columbia Pictures films
Films about cancer
Films scored by John Barry (composer)
Films set in 1963
Films set in Los Angeles
Films set in Detroit
American pregnancy films
Ukrainian-American culture
Films with screenplays by Bruce Joel Rubin
1993 directorial debut films
1990s pregnancy films
1990s English-language films
1990s American films